Wright Township is a township in Dickey County, in the U.S. state of North Dakota.

History
Wright Township was named after Wilson M. Wright, a pioneer settler.

References

Townships in Dickey County, North Dakota
Townships in North Dakota